Just Faaland (January 25, 1922 – February 17, 2017 ) was a Norwegian political economist. He started as an economist with OEEC in 1949. Later he worked for a number of international institutions including the World Bank, ILO, IFAD, FAO, WFP, UNDP, and the Asian Development Bank. Faaland was based as a development researcher at the Chr. Michelsen Institute (CMI) from 1952 to 2017. With the political scientist Stein Rokkan he  initiated and developed broader research programmes and employed more people in the 1950s and in 1961 they defined research programs in international economics and comparative politics. In 1965, the Development Action and Research Programme (DERAP), a development economics project on growth problems in developing countries was formally established. In the early 1980s, Faaland established a human rights programme which soon grew to become the other main focus of CMI's social science research.

Faaland was one of the individuals responsible for the formulation of the Malaysian New Economic Policy. He was also the director general of the International Food Policy Research Institute. and chairman of the UN Committee for Development Planning (1999-2000). Faaland formally retired in 1988.

Faaland was a Knight of the Royal Norwegian Order of St. Olav, was awarded the Malaysian honorary title Tan Sri and held honorary doctorates from the University of Bergen and University of Malaya.

He died on February 17, 2017, at the age of 95.

Honour

Foreign honour
  : Honorary Commander of the Order of Loyalty to the Crown of Malaysia (P.S.M.) (2002)

References

1922 births
2017 deaths
Norwegian economists
Honorary Commanders of the Order of Loyalty to the Crown of Malaysia